Australian Yachtsman of the Year Award  was created in 1962 by Max Press, OAM, the then Commodore of the Parkdale Yacht Club in Melbourne.
The club was launching an appeal to build its new clubhouse on Port Phillip Bay foreshore at Parkdale and to hold an annual Ball at the Springvale Town Hall. To further the attendances, Max Press approached Ampol, the Australian petroleum company and a supporter of sailing through its part sponsorship of the 1962 Australian bid for the America's Cup with the 12-metre yacht, Gretel launched by the syndicate head, Sir Frank Packer. Ampol supported this award for many years, which recognises the outstanding achievements of leading Australian yachtsmen and women.

Rolex, the Swiss watch company, supported the award for many years, presenting a Rolex Submariner to the winner annually.

The award presentations moved to Sydney in 1966 when the voting panel was handed to the Editors of the national boating publication, Modern Boating. The Award briefly went back to Melbourne for three years being presented at the opening of the Melbourne International Boat Show.

In recent years, the award was taken over by Australian Sailing – the governing body for the sport of sailing in Australia.

List of winners of the Australian Yachtsman of the Year award

From 1962 to 1996

Male Sailor of the Year Award, and Female Sailor of the Year Award
From 1996, the award was restructured into Male Sailor of the Year, and Female Sailor of the Year.

References

1962 establishments in Australia
Awards established in 1962
Sailor of the year awards
Australian sports trophies and awards
Sailing in Australia